Little Gay Boy is a French film directed by Antony Hickling in 2013. It has been screened at LGBTQ film festivals around the world and had a cinema release in Paris, France 2013.

Plot
The film centers around a young man Jean-Christophe (J.C) played by Gaëtan Vettier. Born to a prostitute mother and an absent father, J-C. experiments with his sexuality and pushes the limits of his identity, until the day he finally meets this fantasized father. Between raw violence and phantasmagoric reveries, J-C. finds his own path and gradually free himself from the demons of the past.

Cast
 Gaëtan Vettier: J.C
 Manuel Blanc: God
 Amanda Dawson: Maria
 Gala Besson: Angel Gabriel
 Biño Sauitzvy: Danser

Awards
The Trilogy (Little Gay Boy, Where Horses Go To Die & Frig) receives the Christian Petermann award for an innovative work. Controversial scenarios expressed through music, dance and daring at the IV DIGO – Goias Sexual diversity and gender international Film Festival, Brazil, 2019
Special Mention for his work as a director at Rio FICG, Brazil, 2015 
Little Gay Boy – Special mention from the Jury. Chéries-Chéris, France, 2013

References

External links
 

2013 films
Films set in Paris
French LGBT-related films
2013 LGBT-related films
2000s French films
2010s French films